Shinano may refer to:

 Shinano, Nagano, a town in Nagano prefecture, Japan
 Shinano River, the longest river in Japan
 Shinano Province, one of the old provinces of Japan (Nagano Prefecture now)
 Japanese aircraft carrier Shinano, an aircraft carrier of the Imperial Japanese Navy
 Shinano (train) named after the province of old Japan
 Shinano Maru (1900), armed merchantman of the Battle of Tsushima
 Shinano Kenshi